Jason Lee Matthews (born 13 March 1975) is an English semi-professional footballer who plays for Chippenham Town as a goalkeeper and coach.

Career
Born in Paulton, Somerset, Matthews started playing in goal at an early age and soon won a place at Millfield's Centre of Excellence.

Bristol Rovers signed him up on schoolboy terms but he was released just before he left school. Matthews then spent six years playing for a number of clubs in the Screwfix League including Welton Rovers, Paulton and Mangotsfield, before signing for Geoff Butler's Salisbury City.

The following season Matthews signed for Nuneaton Borough, though it was only a couple of months before he was invited to join Exeter City, where he spent the 1999–2000 season, giving him his only taste of Football League action.

He followed this by moving over the Welsh border to Aberystwyth Town for a year before joining Clevedon Town. It was from Clevedon that Geoff Butler signed him for Weymouth in 2002, where he has stayed (and stayed almost unrivalled #1 keeper) for nearly five whole seasons.

On 17 March 2007, he scored his first ever career goal for Weymouth in a Conference National match against Southport. It was all the more remarkable as it was from his own penalty area, in the last minutes of the game, and was the winning goal. It was the first ever goal a Weymouth goalkeeper has scored from open play in the entire history of the club.

Matthews made his Eastleigh debut in the 5–0 away win over Maidenhead United on 8 March 2008 before making his home debut a week later in the 4–1 home defeat at the hands of Hayes & Yeading United a week later.

Adie Britton brought Matthews to Bath City on 22 June 2011. It has been stated that Matthews will start off as second choice keeper but both player and manager are hoping he puts pressure on current first team keeper Glyn Garner.

Matthews signed a one-year contract at Dorchester Town in May 2012. In June 2013 Matthews returned to Weymouth on non contract terms for the 2013–14 season. When Brendon King was sacked he was made temporary Player/Manager at Weymouth. On 12 January 2014, Matthews was appointed player/manager on a full-time basis, after winning four of his seven games.

In the Summer of 2022, Matthews signed for Brislington FC aged 46 playing part-time also working as an electrician.

References

External links

Jason Matthews profile at Welsh Premier Football

1975 births
Living people
People from Paulton
English footballers
Association football goalkeepers
Nuneaton Borough F.C. players
Exeter City F.C. players
Aberystwyth Town F.C. players
Clevedon Town F.C. players
Weymouth F.C. players
Eastleigh F.C. players
Bath City F.C. players
Dorchester Town F.C. players
English Football League players
National League (English football) players
Cymru Premier players
English football managers
Weymouth F.C. managers